Cheiracanthium oncognathum is a spider species found in Europe and Russia.

See also 
 List of Eutichuridae species

References

External links 

oncognathum
Spiders of Europe
Spiders of Russia
Spiders described in 1871